Martin Vojtek (born May 4, 1975) is a retired Czech professional ice hockey goaltender. He played with HC Oceláři Třinec in the Czech Extraliga during the 2010–11 Czech Extraliga season.

References

External links

1975 births
Czech ice hockey goaltenders
HC Oceláři Třinec players
Living people
Sportspeople from Přerov
MsHK Žilina players
HC '05 Banská Bystrica players
HC ZUBR Přerov players
LHK Jestřábi Prostějov players
HC Slezan Opava players
HC Olomouc players
HC Havířov players
Hokej Šumperk 2003 players
Czech expatriate ice hockey players in Slovakia